The Austin Turfcats were a professional indoor football team based in Austin, Texas. The Turfcats were a member of the Indoor Football League (IFL) during the 2010 season, after being a charter member of the Southern Indoor Football League (SIFL) during their inaugural 2009 season. The Turfcats played their home games at Luedecke Arena at the Travis County Exposition Center. This was Austin's fourth attempt at an indoor football team; the prior three were the Indoor Professional Football League's Texas Terminators (1999), the National Indoor Football League's Austin Knights/Rockers (2002–2003), and the Arena Football League (later af2's) Austin Wranglers (2004–2008) (the former two of which played in Luedecke Arena before the Turfcats).

History

Launch: 2009
On November 24, 2008, it was announced that the city of Austin, Texas, had been awarded an expansion franchise for the 2009 startup Southern Indoor Football League (SIFL). On November 25, 2008, it was announced that the team's nickname would be the Turfcats and that they would play their home games at Luedecke Arena at the Travis County Expo Center. Chris Duliban was the team's head coach after previously serving as the defensive coordinator of the Indoor Professional Football League's Texas Terminators and then as the head coach for the CenTex Barracudas of the Intense Football League in 2008. The Turfcats lost their first game 29–37 to the Acadiana Mudbugs. The following week the Turfcats won their first game 34–32 over the Houma Conquerors.

Joining the IFL: 2010
In October 2009, the Turfcats were accepted into the Indoor Football League (IFL) for the 2010 season. They went 2–12 under head coach Duliban and folded after the season.

Season-by-season results

Personnel

Final roster

Head coaches

Front office staff
 Joe Martinez – general manager – IFL
 Ronald Oswalt – general manager – SIFL/IFL
 Jack Dixon – director of operations – SIFL/IFL

2010 season

Schedule

Standings

References

External links
 Official website

 
2008 establishments in Texas
2010 disestablishments in Texas